The following is a list of the MuchMusic Video Awards winners for Best Pop Video.

The award for "Best Pop Video" was not distributed at the 2008 MuchMusic Video Awards, but was distributed again in 2009.

MuchMusic Video Awards
Pop music awards